Devendra Singh Rajput is an Indian politician of the Bharatiya Janata Party. He also holds the position of MLA from Kasganj, Uttar Pradesh. He took part in the 2017 elections and won.

Controversy 
Previously Rajput was held in the case of assaulting Chokhe Lal who was the owner of the shop which he purchased.

Political career 
In 2022 Rajput won the seat of MLA in Kasganj district by 46,265 votes against Man Pal Singh from the Samajwadi Party. In 2017 he also won 101,908 votes against Akhilesh Yadav.

References

Bharatiya Janata Party politicians from Uttar Pradesh
Living people
Year of birth missing (living people)